Frumious Bandersnatch was a psychedelic rock band in the late 1960s.  The band was named after a character from the Lewis Carroll poem "Jabberwocky".  Based in Berkeley, California, the band was active from 1967 to 1969.  Their initial three-song EP produced a minor underground hit with the song "Hearts to Cry".  A recording of their live work, titled A Young Man's Song, was released in 1996 by Big Beat (UK).

Career
The band was formed across the bay from San Francisco in Contra Costa County, and changed personnel several times. Despite interest from several record companies, the band's only release was a three-song EP on their own label, pressed in a quantity of 1,000 and distributed locally.

Four members of Frumious Bandersnatch (Bobby Winkelman, Jack King, Ross Valory, and David Denny) became regular members of the Steve Miller Band.  Valory, along with fellow Frumious Bandersnatch member George Tickner and manager Herbie Herbert, joined  former Santana members Neal Schon and Gregg Rolie to form the band Journey in 1973.

Members 
David Denny – Guitar
Jack King – Drums
George Tickner – Guitar
Ross Valory – Bass
Bobby Winkelman – Rhythm guitar, bass
Bret Willmott - Guitar
Jimmy Warner - Guitar, vocals
Brian Hough
Jack Notestein

Discography
1967 – Frumious Bandersnatch EP; self-produced
1995 – The Berkeley EP's (compilation, three songs featured); Big Beat UK
1996 – A Young Man's Song; Big Beat UK
2003 – Golden Songs of Libra, Get Back
2007 – Love Is the Song We Sing: San Francisco Nuggets 1965–1970 (compilation, feat. "Hearts to Cry"); Rhino Records

In popular culture
Frumious Bandersnatch, along with The Flamin' Groovies, are mentioned in Roger Hall's 1970 novel 19, which refers to them both as one band, "Frumious Bandersnatch and the Flamin' Groovies" (first edition, page 110).

References

Musical groups established in 1967
Musical groups disestablished in 1969
Musical groups from San Francisco
Psychedelic rock music groups from California
1967 establishments in California